The SpongeBob SquarePants Movie is a 2004 American live-action/animated adventure comedy film based on the Nickelodeon animated television series SpongeBob SquarePants. The film was directed, co-written, and produced by series creator Stephen Hillenburg, with live-action sequences directed by Mark Osborne. It features the series' regular voice cast consisting of Tom Kenny, Bill Fagerbakke, Clancy Brown, Rodger Bumpass, Mr. Lawrence, Jill Talley, Carolyn Lawrence, and Mary Jo Catlett. Guest stars Alec Baldwin, Scarlett Johansson, and Jeffrey Tambor voice new characters, and David Hasselhoff appears in live-action as himself. It is the first film in the SpongeBob SquarePants film series. In this film, Plankton enacts a plan to discredit his business nemesis Mr. Krabs, steal the Krabby Patty secret formula and take over the world by stealing King Neptune's crown and framing Mr. Krabs for the crime. SpongeBob and Patrick team up to retrieve the crown from Shell City to save Mr. Krabs from Neptune's wrath and their world from Plankton's rule.

Hillenburg accepted an offer for a film adaptation of SpongeBob SquarePants from Paramount Pictures in 2002, after having turned it down multiple times the previous year. He assembled a team from the show's writing staff, including himself, Derek Drymon, Tim Hill, Kent Osborne, Aaron Springer, and Paul Tibbitt, and they structured the film as a mythical hero's journey that would bring SpongeBob and Patrick to the surface. The film was originally intended to serve as the series finale, but Nickelodeon ordered more episodes of the series as it had become increasingly profitable, so Hillenburg resigned as showrunner, with Tibbitt taking his place.

The SpongeBob SquarePants Movie premiered in Los Angeles on November 14, 2004, and was released in the United States on November 19. It received generally positive reviews and grossed $141 million worldwide, becoming the seventh highest-grossing animated film of 2004. Two standalone sequels have been released: The SpongeBob Movie: Sponge Out of Water (2015) and The SpongeBob Movie: Sponge on the Run (2020), with a fourth film currently in development.

Plot

In Bikini Bottom, SpongeBob SquarePants prepares for the opening ceremony of the Krusty Krab 2 (located next to the original Krusty Krab), believing that his boss Mr. Krabs will promote him as manager. At the ceremony, the title is instead given to his co-worker Squidward Tentacles. Krabs explains to SpongeBob that Squidward is more mature and that he is "just a kid" who would be unable to handle the task, upsetting SpongeBob.

Meanwhile, Plankton laments over his futile attempts to steal the Krabby Patty secret formula and take over the world, until his computer wife Karen reminds him of "Plan Z". Later, Plankton carries out the plan by stealing King Neptune's crown and sending it to Shell City, leaving false evidence to frame Krabs for the crime. That night, SpongeBob heads to his favorite restaurant, Goofy Goober's, where he drowns his sorrows in ice cream with his best friend Patrick Star, and wakes up the next morning with a hangover. King Neptune goes to the Krusty Krab 2 to confront Krabs about his stolen crown. The still-hungover SpongeBob also arrives and bad-mouths Krabs, but afterward promises Neptune that he will retrieve the crown from Shell City. Neptune freezes Krabs and orders SpongeBob to return within six days in order to spare his boss' life. Neptune's daughter Mindy warns SpongeBob and Patrick of the dangers of Shell City, including "the Cyclops", a monster who kidnaps innocent sea creatures. SpongeBob and Patrick head off for Shell City in the Patty Wagon, a Krabby Patty-shaped car stored underneath the restaurant.

Back in Bikini Bottom, Plankton steals the Krabby Patty formula from the frozen Krabs and uses it to sell Krabby Patties. When Karen informs him that SpongeBob and Patrick are attempting to reclaim Neptune's crown, Plankton reveals he has hired a hitman named Dennis to eliminate the duo. Squidward discovers the truth about Plankton stealing Neptune's crown, and confronts him. Before Squidward can leave and alert Neptune, Plankton activates his mind-controlling bucket helmets to subjugate the residents of Bikini Bottom, enslaving Squidward as well. Meanwhile, SpongeBob and Patrick come across a hazardous trench and lose the Patty Wagon. On the verge of giving up, Mindy appears and gives them encouragement by using her "mermaid magic" to bestow seaweed mustaches on them, fooling them that they have matured from boys into men. The two then successfully pass the trench.

SpongeBob and Patrick meet Dennis, who reveals that the mustaches are fake. He tries to crush them with his giant boot, but is abruptly stomped on by a larger boot - which belongs to the Cyclops (a diver). The Cyclops captures SpongeBob and Patrick and takes them to his store by the beach, where dried sea creatures are sold as souvenirs. SpongeBob and Patrick learn that the store is "Shell City" itself and find the crown, only to dry out and die from the intensity of the Cyclops' heat lamp. However, the tears they shed short-circuit the lamp, activating the emergency sprinkler system and reviving the duo alongside the dried sea creatures. While the sea creatures attack the Cyclops, SpongeBob and Patrick take the crown and head to the beach. After accidentally losing their way home, David Hasselhoff appears and offers them a ride. On the way, Dennis catches up to them, but gets knocked off Hasselhoff's back into the sea.

Back at the Krusty Krab 2, Neptune arrives to execute Krabs, but SpongeBob and Patrick return with the crown just in time. Plankton drops a mind-control bucket on Neptune and surrounds SpongeBob, Patrick and Mindy with his army of slaves. SpongeBob, embracing the fact that he's accomplished so much despite being a kid, uses the power of rock and roll to play the song "Goofy Goober Rock", freeing Neptune and the citizens of Bikini Bottom from all of Plankton's buckets with his magic guitar. Plankton is arrested by the police, and King Neptune rewards SpongeBob for his bravery by unfreezing Krabs. A jubilant Krabs gives SpongeBob the job as manager of the Krusty Krab 2.

Cast

Live-action
 David Hasselhoff as himself, he helps SpongeBob and Patrick get back to Bikini Bottom.
 Kristopher Logan as Squinty the Pirate
 D.P. FitzGerald as Bonesy the Pirate
 Cole S. McKay as Scruffy the Pirate
 Dylan Haggerty as Stitches the Pirate
 Bart McCarthy as Captain Bart, a pirate captain whose crew goes to see the film on theaters upon seeing tickets inside a treasure chest.
 Henry Kingi as Inky the Pirate
 Randolph Jones as Tiny the Pirate
 Paul Zies as Upper Deck the Pirate
 Gerard Griesbaum as Fingers the Pirate
 Aaron Hendry as:
 Tangles the Pirate
 Cyclops (in-suit performer), this was just a guy in an atmospheric diving suit who was called this by the sea creatures.
 Maxie Santillan Jr. as Gummy the Pirate
 Peter DeYoung as Leatherbeard the Pirate
 Gino Montesinos as Tango the Pirate
 John Sicillano as Pokey the Pirate
 David Stifel as Cookie the Pirate
 Alex Baker as Martin the Pirate
 Robin Russell as Sniffy the Pirate
 Tommy Schooler as Salty the Pirate
 Ben Wilson as Stovepipe the Pirate
 José Zelaya as Dooby the Pirate
 Derek Drymon as Fisherman
 Michael Patrick Bell as Fisherman

Mageina Tovah portrays a theater usher during the mid-credits scene where she tells the pirates that they need to leave as the movie is over.

Voices

 Tom Kenny as:
 SpongeBob SquarePants
 Gary the Snail
 French Narrator
 Clay
 Tough Fish #2
 Twin #2
 Houston Voice
 Bill Fagerbakke as
 Patrick Star
 Fish #2
 Chum Customer
 Local Fish
 Clancy Brown as Mr. Krabs
 Rodger Bumpass as
 Squidward Tentacles
 Fish #4
 Mr. Lawrence as:
 Plankton
 Fish #7
 Chum Customer
 Local Fish
 Alec Baldwin as Dennis, a hitman hired by Plankton.
 Scarlett Johansson as Princess Mindy, the Princess of the Sea.
 Jeffrey Tambor as King Neptune, the King of the Sea. A variation of the character was previously voiced by John O'Hurley in the TV series.
 Jill Talley as:
 Karen
 Old Lady
 Neil Ross as Cyclops
 Carolyn Lawrence as Sandy Cheeks
 Mary Jo Catlett as Mrs. Puff
 Lori Alan as Pearl Krabs
 Dee Bradley Baker as:
 Man Cop
 Phil
 Perch Perkins
 Waiter
 Attendant #1
 Thug #1
 Coughing Fish
 Twin #1
 Frog Fish Monster
 Freed Fish
 Sandals
 Sirena Irwin as:
 Reporter
 Driver
 Ice Cream Lady
 Thomas F. Wilson as:
 Fish #3
 Tough Fish #1
 Victor
 Carlos Alazraqui as:
 Squire
 Goofy Goober Announcer
 Thief
 Joshua Seth as a prisoner who King Neptune incarcerated for touching his crown even though he told King Neptune that he's the Royal Crown Polisher.
 Tim Blaney as Singing Goofy Goober
 Derek Drymon as The Screamer
 Aaron Springer as Laughing Bubble
 Stephen Hillenburg as a parrot

Other characters from the television series also appear in the film. Carlos Alazraqui, director Stephen Hillenburg, and Neil Ross voice King Neptune's squire, a parrot, and the Cyclops, respectively.

Production

Development
The SpongeBob SquarePants Movie was long-planned; Nickelodeon and Paramount Pictures had approached series creator Stephen Hillenburg for a film based on the show, but he refused for more than a year. Hillenburg was concerned, after watching The Iron Giant (1999) and Toy Story (1995) with his son, about the challenge of SpongeBob and Patrick doing something more cinematically-consequential and inspiring without losing what he called the SpongeBob "cadence". While on a break from season four post-production, "To do a 75-minute movie about SpongeBob wanting to make some jellyfish jelly would be a mistake, I think this had to be SpongeBob in a great adventure. That's where the comedy's coming from, having these two naïve characters, SpongeBob and Patrick, a doofus and an idiot, on this incredibly dangerous heroic odyssey with all the odds against them."

In 2002, Hillenburg and the show's staff stopped making episodes to work on the film after the show's third season. The film's plot originally had SpongeBob rescue Patrick from a fisherman in Florida; an obvious reference to the 2003 film, Finding Nemo (2003), this was later said by Tom Kenny (the voice of SpongeBob) to be a "joke" plot to keep fans busy. Hillenburg directed and produced the film, and also co-wrote it with five other writer-animators from the show (Paul Tibbitt, Derek Drymon, Aaron Springer, Kent Osborne, and Tim Hill) over a three-month period in a room of a former Glendale, California bank. Osborne said, "It was hugely fun although it did get kind of gamy in there." At the beginning of the series, Hillenburg screened a number of silent shorts (from Laurel and Hardy, Charlie Chaplin, and Buster Keaton) and work by two modern comic actors: Jerry Lewis and Pee-wee Herman, both obvious inspirations for SpongeBob. For the film, the writers created a mythical hero's quest: the search for a stolen crown, which brings SpongeBob and Patrick to the surface. Bill Fagerbakke (the voice of Patrick) said about the plot, "It's just nuts. I'm continually dazzled and delighted with what these guys came up with."

When the film was completed, Hillenburg wanted to end the series "so it wouldn't jump the shark". However, Nickelodeon desired more episodes; Hillenburg stated: "Well, there was concern when we did the movie [in 2004] that the show had peaked. There were concerns among executives at Nickelodeon." As a result, Hillenburg resigned as the series' showrunner, appointing writer, director, and storyboard artist Paul Tibbitt to succeed him. Tibbitt was one of Hillenburg's favorite crew members: "[I] totally trusted him." Tibbitt would remain showrunner until he was succeeded in 2015 by the show's creative director Vincent Waller and staff writer Marc Ceccarelli. He also acted as an executive producer from 2008 to 2018. While Hillenburg no longer wrote or directly ran the show on a day-to-day basis, he reviewed each episode and submitted suggestions: "I figure when I'm pretty old I can still paint I don't know about running shows." Kenny, Fagerbakke, and the crew confirmed that they had completed four episodes for broadcast on Nickelodeon in early 2005, and planned to finish a total of about 20 for the fourth season. In 2015, Hillenburg returned to the show following the completion of the second film as an executive producer, having greater creative input and attending crew meetings until his death on November 26, 2018.

In September 2003, Jules Engel, Hillenburg's mentor when he studied experimental animation at the California Institute of the Arts, died. Hillenburg dedicated the film to him: "He truly was the most influential artistic person in my life. I consider him my 'Art Dad.'"

Casting

The film stars the series' main cast members: Tom Kenny as SpongeBob SquarePants, Gary the Snail, and the French Narrator, Bill Fagerbakke as Patrick Star, Rodger Bumpass as Squidward Tentacles, Clancy Brown as Mr. Krabs, Mr. Lawrence as Plankton, Jill Talley as Karen, Carolyn Lawrence as Sandy Cheeks, Mary Jo Catlett as Mrs. Puff, and Lori Alan as Pearl Krabs. It also features Dee Bradley Baker as Perch Perkins, Carlos Alazraqui as King Neptune's squire, Aaron Hendry as the Cyclops, and Neil Ross as the voice of the Cyclops. In addition to the series' cast, it was reported on March 23, 2004, that Scarlett Johansson, Jeffrey Tambor, and Alec Baldwin would play new characters Princess Mindy, King Neptune, and Dennis, respectively, and David Hasselhoff would appear as himself.

Johansson accepted the role because she liked cartoons and was a fan of The Ren & Stimpy Show. When Jeffrey Tambor signed for his voice cameo, he saw his character (King Neptune) and joked, "This is me." He remembered the first cartoon he saw, Bambi (1942): "My first cartoon, I had to be carried out crying It was Bambi. It's like the great American wound: the death of Bambi's mother. 'Run, Bambi, run!'" Another guest voice was Alec Baldwin; Stephen Hillenburg said that the actor recorded his character Dennis on a "phone": "I wouldn't say that about his performance. He might be mad if we said that. Technically, it was like he was in another booth in the studio."

David Hasselhoff accepted the role when his daughters, Taylor-Ann and Hayley, urged him: "I got an offer to do a cameo in the SpongeBob Movie and I turned to my girls, who were like 16 and 14, and I said, 'Who's SpongeBob?' and they said, 'Oh my God, Dad, it's the number one cartoon in the world, you gotta do it.'" Hasselhoff enjoyed his cameo: "It was great fun and to this day around the world kids stop me and say, 'Are you David Hasselhoff?' because I was the only human in the picture." Hasselhoff said that the film gained him new fans: "It's amazing - so many of the kids were so young and didn't see Baywatch and Knight Rider so I got a whole new legion of fans."

Animation
There were a number of stages involved in the making of the film, beginning with a rough animation process of ideas drawn on Post-it notes. The writers drew, working from rough outlines rather than scripts (which made the humor more visual than verbal). The storyboard artists, including Sherm Cohen, then illustrated ideas conceived by the writers. In the series Tom Yasumi and Andrew Overtoom do the animatics, but Hillenburg and Drymon did the animatics for the film. Yasumi and Overtoom were the film's animation-timing directors, concentrating on the sheets. The SpongeBob SquarePants Movie, like the series, was animated at Rough Draft Studios in South Korea. The animators worked semi-digitally with pencil-drawn poses that would be composited into layouts in Photoshop.

Series writer and storyboard artist Erik Wiese left the show for a year to work on Samurai Jack and Danny Phantom, but returned to do storyboards and character layout for the film. He "always wanted to be a feature animator, and the movie felt like I was on the character animation end", describing the experience as "a blast it felt like coming home."

Hillenburg enjoyed the process of making the film: "The TV schedule is tight, and you don't always have a lot of time to work on your drawings." He appreciated the film's hand-drawn animation: "I think the movie's drawings are much superior than the TV show", although CGI animation was flourishing at the time of the film's release. "There's a lot of talk about 2-D being dead, and I hope people don't think that. Even Brad Bird is a proponent of 2-D. He would agree with me that it's all about what you're trying to say. There are many ways to tell a story, and what's unique about animation is that there are many styles with which to tell a story." The clay animation scenes were shot by Mark Caballero, Seamus Walsh and Chris Finnegan at Screen Novelties in Los Angeles.

Filming
The film features live-action scenes directed by Mark Osborne in Santa Monica, California. The ship used during the 30-second opening featuring the pirates singing the theme song was the Bounty, a -long, enlarged reconstruction of the 1787 Royal Navy sailing ship HMS Bounty built for Mutiny on the Bounty (1962). The ship appeared in a number of other films, including Treasure Island (1999), Pirates of the Caribbean: Dead Man's Chest (2006), and Pirates of the Caribbean: At World's End (2007). In film trailers, live-action scenes were taken from Das Boot (1981), The Hunt for Red October (1990), and U-571 (2000).

David Hasselhoff made a cameo in the live-action scenes, offering SpongeBob and Patrick a ride to Bikini Bottom. The scene was originally written before consulting Hasselhoff. Hillenburg was pleased with the storyboards; Lead storyboard artist Sherm Cohen said, "He had been wrestling with the ending for quite a while, and finally he was ready to pitch his ideas to some of the other board artists." Hillenburg was counting on casting Hasselhoff, and the first question he asked him was "So, do we have Hasselhoff?" He replied "No", with a grin. Hasselhoff eventually agreed, before seeing the script. Hillenburg said about the actor, "He's a great guy. ... He was great at making fun of himself."

The $100,000 replica was kept at Hasselhoff's home; he has said, "It freaked me out because it was so lifelike, with teeth, when you touch it it feels like real skin. It's soft, like your skin." At the completion of filming, Hasselhoff said, "That's ridiculously awesome. What are you gonna do with it?" Asked by the crew if he wanted to keep it, he answered, "Uh, yeah. Okay." Hasselhoff filmed in cold water, where he was pulled by a sled nine yards across the sea; he described the experience as "cold but a lot of fun."

In late March 2014, Hasselhoff offered the replica up for auction with other memorabilia collected during his career. Julien's Auctions handled the item's sale, which were expected to bring in between $20,000 and $30,000. Ultimately, Hasselhoff pulled the item, just a few days before the auction.

Deleted scenes

The DVD and Blu-ray releases include animatics of deleted scenes from the film, including SpongeBob and Patrick's meeting with Sandy Cheeks (a squirrel) on the surface after their escape from Shell City. Patrick repeatedly vomits, upset by Sandy's unusual appearance. The squirrel is pursued by black-suited exterminators, and defends herself with acorns. She informs SpongeBob and Patrick that they can return to Bikini Bottom by taking a bus at the beach. This idea was later used for the second film The SpongeBob Movie: Sponge Out of Water (2015), where Sandy became a giant realistic squirrel.

In 2013, the film's lead storyboard artist, Sherm Cohen, released a storyboard panel of a deleted scene from the film with SpongeBob awakening from his dream saying "WEEEEE!" and Mr. Krabs holding a manager's hat.

Soundtrack

Gregor Narholz composed the score for the film, conducting the recording sessions (in 5.1 surround sound) with the London Metropolitan Orchestra at Abbey Road Studios in London. Narholz was signed when series music editor Nick Carr recommended him to Hillenburg after they worked together at the Associated Production Music library. Narholz was honored at the 2005 ASCAP Film and Television Music Awards for his work on the film, and received a nomination for Music in an Animated Feature Production at the 32nd Annie Awards.

American rock band The Flaming Lips recorded "SpongeBob And Patrick Confront the Psychic Wall of Energy". They shot the song's music video, directed by band member Wayne Coyne and filmmaker Bradley Beesley, in Austin, Texas. Coyne said, "Stephen Hillenburg seems to be a fan of the weirder music of the late '80s and early '90s. He wanted to evoke the music he got turned onto back then." Coyne suggested a duet with Justin Timberlake, but Hillenburg refused, saying "I don't want any of those sort of commercial weirdos on there. I don't like those commercial people. I like you guys, and Wilco and Ween." American band Wilco wrote and recorded "Just a Kid". One of the film's producers contacted frontman Jeff Tweedy after seeing a SpongeBob air freshener hanging from Tweedy's rearview mirror in I Am Trying to Break Your Heart: A Film About Wilco (2002). Tweedy said, "I fell in love with SpongeBob when I heard him describe the darkness at the bottom of the sea as 'advanced darkness'. How could I not write a song for this film? It automatically makes me the coolest dad on the block." Avril Lavigne recorded the series' theme for the soundtrack. Other artists contributing to the soundtrack were Motörhead, singing "You Better Swim" (a derivative of their 1992 song "You Better Run"); Prince Paul ("Prince Paul's Bubble Party"); Ween ("Ocean Man"), and the Shins ("They'll Soon Discover", partially written in 2001).

"The Best Day Ever", written by Tom Kenny (SpongeBob's voice actor) and Andy Paley, was featured in the film and on its soundtrack. Kenny and Paley were working on what would become the album The Best Day Ever, writing "The Best Day Ever" and "Under My Rock". The film's production team needed two more tracks for the soundtrack; Hillenburg heard the songs, and decided to include them. "The Best Day Ever" ended up being played during the film's closing credits.

Marketing

Promotion
Julia Pistor, the film's co-producer, said that although Nickelodeon (which owns the SpongeBob trademark) wanted to sell character-themed backpacks, lunch boxes, and wristwatches it respected Hillenburg's integrity and gave him control of merchandising. Hillenburg had no problem with candy and ice cream tie-ins, Pistor said (because of the treats' simplicity), but he had issues with fast food tie-ins; according to him, the latter was "full of hidden additives." Pistor said, "The trouble is that you can't go out with animated films without a fast-food tie-in. People don't take you seriously." Hillenburg replied, "Yeah, well, my take on that is that we shouldn't do that. We didn't want to suddenly become the people serving up food that's not that good for you especially kids. We work with Burger King, and they make toys and watches. But to actually take the step of pushing the food, that's crossing the line. I don't want to be the Pied Piper of fast food." Variety estimated the media value was $150 million.

The film was promoted across the United States. Nickelodeon joined Burger King for a 12-figure toy line based on the film, and about 4,700 Burger King stores perched , inflatable SpongeBob figures on their roofs as part of the promotion (one of the largest in fast food history). Customers could also purchase one of five different SpongeBob-themed watches for $1.99 with the purchase of a value meal.

On November 11, 2004, it was reported that a number of the inflatables had been stolen from Burger King roofs nationwide. Burger King chief marketing officer Russ Klein said, "As to the motives behind these apparent 'spongenappings', we can only speculate. We did receive one ransom note related to an inflatable SpongeBob disappearance in Minnesota." The chain offered a year's supply of Whopper sandwiches as a reward for information leading to the return of inflatables stolen in November. One was found attached to a railing at the football-field 50-yard line at an Iowa college, and another under a bed in Virginia. A ransom note was found for a third: "We have SpongeBob. Give us 10 Krabby Patties, fries, and milkshakes." Steven Simon and Conrad (C.J.) Mercure Jr. were arrested after stealing an inflatable from a Burger King in St. Mary's County, Maryland. While facing up to 18 months in jail and a $500 fine, Simon and Mercure said they were proud of what they did; Simon said, "Once we got caught by the police, we were like, now we can tell everybody." The following year, Burger King took "extra security precautions" in response to the SpongeBob incident, when Stormtroopers from George Lucas' Star Wars guarded the delivery of Star Wars toys to a Burger King in North Hollywood as part of a promotion for Revenge of the Sith (2005).

The Cayman Islands joined with Nickelodeon to create the first Cayman Islands Sea School with SpongeBob for the film. The partnership was announced by Pilar Bush, Deputy Director of Tourism for Cayman Islands, on March 10, 2004. As part of the agreement the Cayman partnership was seen on Nickelodeon's global multimedia platforms, including on-air, online, and in magazines. Other promotional partners included Mitsubishi, Holiday Inn, Kellogg's, and Perfetti Van Melle.

In 2005, Nickelodeon and Simon Spotlight released a book, Ice-Cream Dreams, as a tie-in to the film. It was written by Nancy E. Krulik and illustrated by Heather Martinez, with Krulik and Derek Drymon as contributors.

SpongeBob SquarePants Movie 300
It was the first race of its kind where children at the track could listen to a special, "kid-friendly" radio broadcast of the event.

Kyle Busch and Jimmie Johnson debuted a pair of SpongeBob SquarePants-themed Chevrolet race cars in the race. Johnson's No. 48 Chevrolet included an image of SpongeBob across the hood, and Busch's No. 5 Chevrolet featured Patrick Star. Johnson said, "This sounds so cool I know there are a lot of families who will be excited that Lowe's is doing this. The great thing is there will be something for every type of race fan. Plus how can we go wrong with SpongeBob helping us out on the car?"

Release
The SpongeBob SquarePants Movie premiered on November 14, 2004, at Grauman's Chinese Theatre in Los Angeles. It was released in the United States on November 19. Among celebrities who saw the premiere with their children were Ray Romano, Larry King, Ice Cube, Gary Dourdan, and Lisa Kudrow. The carpet was a reminder of home for Tom Kenny, SpongeBob's voice actor; he said, "I have a 15-month-old daughter, so I'm no stranger to yellow carpets."

The film was released on VHS and DVD on March 1, 2005, in wide- and full-screen editions, by Paramount Home Entertainment. The VHS release is known for being the last animated film by Nickelodeon Movies to be released on the platform. The DVD special features include an 18-minute featurette, The Absorbing Tale Behind The SpongeBob SquarePants Movie, featuring interviews with most of the principal cast and crew; a 15-minute featurette, Case of the Sponge "Bob", hosted by Jean-Michel Cousteau; a 20-minute animatic segment featuring scenes from the film with dialogue by the original artists, and the film's trailer. As a tie-in to the film's DVD release, 7-Eleven served a limited-edition Under-the-Sea Pineapple Slurpee in March 2005. The film was released as a Blu-ray-plus-DVD combination pack on March 29, 2011, alongside Charlotte's Web. It was re-released on DVD and Blu-ray on December 30, 2014.

Reception

Box office
The SpongeBob SquarePants Movie earned $9,559,752 on its opening day in the United States, second behind National Treasure (2004) (which earned $11 million). It grossed a combined total of $32,018,216 during its opening weekend, on 4,300 screens at 3,212 theaters, averaging $9,968 per venue (or $7,446 per screen, again second to National Treasure). The film dropped an unexpected 44 percent over the Thanksgiving weekend, and 57 percent the weekend after that. The opening weekend earned 37.48 percent of the film's final gross. It closed on March 24, 2005, failing to out-gross holiday animated competitors The Incredibles (2004) ($261,441,092) and The Polar Express (2004) ($183,373,735). It was still profitable for distributor Paramount Pictures and producer Nickelodeon Movies, earning $85,417,988 in the United States and $140,161,792 worldwide on a budget of $30 million.

Critical response

Its critical consensus reads, "Surreally goofy and entertaining for both children and their parents." Metacritic (which uses a weighted average) assigned The SpongeBob SquarePants Movie a score of 66 out of 100 based on 32 critics, indicating "generally favorable reviews". Audiences polled by CinemaScore gave the film an average grade of "B+" on an A+ to F scale.

Roger Ebert of the Chicago Sun-Times gave the film three stars out of four, calling it "the 'Good Burger' of animation plopping us down inside a fast-food war being fought by sponges, starfish, crabs, tiny plankton and mighty King Neptune." Ed Park of The Village Voice wrote, "No Pixar? No problem! An unstoppable good-mood generator, the resolutely 2-D [The] SpongeBob SquarePants Movie has more yuks than Shark Tale (2004) and enough soul to swallow The Polar Express whole." Michael Rechtshaffen of The Hollywood Reporter gave the film a positive review, calling it "an animated adventure that's funnier than Shark Tale and more charming than The Polar Express." Randy Cordova of The Arizona Republic said, "Like the TV show it's based on, it's a daffy, enjoyable creation." Jami Bernard of the New York Daily News gave the feature a score of three out of four: "It's not The Incredibles, or one of those animated features that spent zillions on character design, pedigree and verisimilitude. But SpongeBob is a sweet, silly thing with a child-friendly esthetic all its own." Will Lawrence of Empire gave the film four out of five stars, calling it "a film for kids, students, stoners, anyone who enjoys a break from reality." Lisa Schwarzbaum of Entertainment Weekly gave it a B-minus grade: "The best moments in his [SpongeBob SquarePants] first movie outing are those that feel most TV-like, just another day in the eternally optimistic undersea society created with such contagious silliness by Stephen Hillenburg." Desson Thomson of The Washington Post enjoyed the film: "You gotta love SpongeBob. Coolest sponge in the sea, although this one has a suspiciously manufactured look."

Carla Meyer of the San Francisco Chronicle wrote that "The SpongeBob SquarePants Movie retains the 2-D charm of the hugely popular Nickelodeon cartoon but adds a few tricks a little 3-D here, a little David Hasselhoff there. The series' appeal never lay in its visuals, however. 'SpongeBob' endeared itself to kids and adults through sweetness and cleverness, also abundant here." A. O. Scott of The New York Times gave it a score of four out of five: "If you're tired of bluster and swagger, SpongeBob is your man." Tom Maurstad of The Dallas Morning News also gave the film a B-minus grade: "Being so good is what led to making the movie, and it's also the reason that many small-screen episodes are better than this big-screen venture."

Some reviews praised David Hasselhoff's appearance in the film. Jennifer Frey of The Washington Post wrote, "Getting to see the hairs on Hasselhoff's back (and thighs, and calves) magnified exponentially is perhaps a bit creepy. Like the movie, it's all in good fun." Cinema Blend founder Joshua Tyler called Hasselhoff's role "the best movie cameo I've seen since Fred Savage stuck a joint in his crotch and played a clarinet to charm the resulting smoke like a snake."

David Edelstein of Slate criticized the film's plot, calling it a "big, heavy anchor of a story structure to weigh him down." Mike Clark of USA Today called it "harmlessly off-the-cuff — but facing far more pedigreed multiplex competition — SpongeBob barely rates as OK when compared with The Incredibles." A reviewer noted in Time Out London, "Anyone expecting anything more risky will be sadly disappointed." In his Variety review, Todd McCarthy said the film "takes on rather too much water during its extended feature-length submersion."

While the film received mostly positive reviews by critics and by fans of the show, it is considered a turning point in the show's history; many fans believe that the television series has declined in quality since the film's release. While episodes aired before the film were praised for their "uncanny brilliance", those aired after the film have been called "kid-pandering attention-waster[s]", "tedious", "boring", "dreck", a "depressing plateau of mediocrity" and "laugh-skimpy." After the film's release, fans "began to turn away from the show," causing fansites to "bec[ome] deserted." Some fans believe that the show's 2012 ratings decline correlates with a decline in quality, and "whatever fan support [the show] enjoys is not enough" to save it from its slide in ratings. This was due to the fact that Stephen Hillenburg and many writers left the show.

Accolades

Fan project

In honor of Stephen Hillenburg, a non-profit re-animated collaboration project, titled The SpongeBob SquarePants Movie Rehydrated, was released online on May 1, 2022. Similarly to 3GI's Shrek Retold collaboration, the video consists of over 300 artists recreating the film's animation and audio in their own artistic styles. Amid the YouTube premiere, the video was taken down by Paramount Global due to copyright laws. As a result, the hashtag #JusticeForSpongeBob became trending on Twitter against Paramount's action. The video was restored the following day.

Video game

A video game based on the film was released for PlayStation 2 PC, Game Boy Advance, Xbox, and GameCube on October 27, 2004 for Mac OS X in 2005 and PlayStation 3 on February 7, 2012. The home-console version was developed by Heavy Iron Studios; the Game Boy Advance version was developed by WayForward Technologies and published by THQ.

It was created on the same engine as SpongeBob SquarePants: Battle for Bikini Bottom. Game developer Heavy Iron Studios tweaked the graphics to give the game a sharper and more-imaginative look than Battle for Bikini Bottom. It increased the polygon count, added several racing levels and incorporated many creatures from the film. The game's plot was based on the film, with SpongeBob and Patrick on a mission taking them outside Bikini Bottom to retrieve Neptune's crown. On October 4, 2004, THQ announced the game's mobile release. Nickelodeon vice-president for new-media business development Paul Jelinek said, "As one of the leading publishers of wireless entertainment content, THQ Wireless is introducing the SpongeBob SquarePants license to a whole new audience of gamers THQ has been a great partner to Nickelodeon over the years and we look forward to the same standard of excellence with these upcoming SpongeBob SquarePants games for wireless devices." The mobile console was developed by Amplified Games.

Standalone sequels

The SpongeBob Movie: Sponge Out of Water

A second film, which was announced in February 2012, was directed by Paul Tibbitt, written by Jonathan Aibel and Glenn Berger, and executive-produced by Stephen Hillenburg, who co-wrote the story with Tibbit. Paramount stated in early June 2014 that the film would be released on February 6, 2015. The film involves SpongeBob, Patrick, Squidward, Mr. Krabs, Plankton and Sandy taking back the Krabby Patty secret formula from a pirate that stole it, resulting in them making it to land.

The SpongeBob Movie: Sponge on the Run

The third film, The SpongeBob Movie: Sponge on the Run, was announced in late 2019 and was released on August 14, 2020, in Canada and on March 4, 2021, on Paramount+ in the United States. Tim Hill served as the director and the screenplay was written by Aaron Springer with Jonathan Aibel and Glenn Berger. The film follows SpongeBob and Patrick on a rescue mission to save Gary, and reveals how SpongeBob and Gary met at Kamp Koral.

Literature 
 2004: Marc Cerasini: SpongeBob SquarePants Movie: A novelization of the hit movie!, Simon Spotlight,

References

External links

 
 
 
 

2000s adventure comedy films
2000s American animated films
2004 animated films
American adventure comedy films
American children's animated adventure films
American films with live action and animation
Animated films about fish
Animated films based on animated series
Films based on television series
Films directed by Stephen Hillenburg
Films produced by Stephen Hillenburg
Films scored by Gregor Narholz
Films set in the Pacific Ocean
Films shot in California
Films with screenplays by Stephen Hillenburg
Nickelodeon animated films
Nickelodeon Movies films
Paramount Pictures films
Paramount Pictures animated films
Rough Draft Studios films
 
2004 comedy films
American slapstick comedy films
Films about mind control
Films about robbery
2000s English-language films
Films with screenplays by Derek Drymon
Films with screenplays by Tim Hill
Films with screenplays by Kent Osborne
Films with screenplays by Aaron Springer
Films with screenplays by Paul Tibbitt